Eurescom is a private organisation for managing European research and development projects in telecommunications. Eurescom is based in Heidelberg, Germany, and currently has 16 network operators as members performing collaborative research and development.

History
In 1991, the European Institute for Research and Strategic Studies in Telecommunications GmbH (Eurescom) was founded by European telecommunications network operators as an organisation for coordinating collaborative research and development programmes. In mid-1990, 26 European network operators signed a Memorandum of Understanding as a basis for establishing the institute as a centre for collaborative research and development in Heidelberg, Germany.

Since 1991, Eurescom produced several hundred European telecommunications technology project results. Eurescom made, for example, contributions to the introduction of interoperable European ISDN, the design of network management systems, specifications in the Internet domain, and the development of new services and applications for mobile networks and fixed networks.

Eurescom works with other European organisations in the telecommunications sector, including the European Telecommunications Standards Institute. In 1998, ETSI, Eurescom and the ACTS programme on Advanced Communications Technologies of the European Commission agreed on closer collaboration.

Members 
Deutsche Telekom, Germany
France Telecom, France
BT Group, United Kingdom
OTE, Greece
Portugal Telecom, Portugal
Telekom Austria, Austria
Telenor, Norway
eircom, Ireland
Magyar Telekom, Hungary
CYTA, Cyprus
Síminn, Iceland
Slovak Telecom, Slovak Republic
Republic Telecommunication Agency (RATEL), Republic of Serbia
Swisscom, Switzerland
Telecom Italia, Italy

Activities
Eurescom has been involved in EU research projects under the Framework Programmes for Research and Technological Development and  EUREKA. Eurescom participates in discussions on the future of information and communication technologies (ICT) as a member of the Wireless World Research Forum and in the European Technology Platforms Emobility Technology Platform and Networked and Electronic Media. Eurescom is involved in future Internet research. In addition, Eurescom runs its own Eurescom Study Programme, in which European network operators collaborate on exploring future telecommunications technologies.
Eurescom provides a set of Web-based project management tools called EuresTools.

See also
 Community Research & Development Information Service (CORDIS)
 EUREKA
 European Institute of Innovation and Technology (EIT)
 European Research Area (ERA)
 European Research Council (ERC)
 European Telecommunications Standards Institute (ETSI)
 Lisbon Strategy
 Project management 
 Framework Programmes for Research and Technological Development

References

External links
Eurescom Website
CELTIC Website
European Future Internet Portal 
WWRF - Wireless World Research Forum
eMobility Technology Platform
NEM Technology Platform

Eureka (organisation)
Telecommunications organizations